Kärntner Straße (Carinthian Street) is the most famous street in central Vienna. It runs from the Stephansplatz out to the Wiener Staatsoper at Karlsplatz on the Ringstraße. The first record of Kärntner Straße is from 1257, as Strata Carintianorum, which refers to its importance as a trade route to the southern province of Carinthia.

References

External links 

 

Innere Stadt
Shopping districts and streets in Austria
Streets in Vienna
Pedestrian streets in Austria